Statistics of USL D3 Pro League in season 2001.

League standings

Conference semi-finals
Boston defeated Reading, 6-0
New Jersey defeated New Hampshire 4-2
Greenville defeated Carolina 2-1
Stanlslaus defeated Arizona 2-1
Chico defeated Tucson 5-1

Conference finals
Boston defeated New Jersey 2-0
Greenville defeated Wilmington 3-3 (4-3 PK)
Stanislaus United defeated Chicago 2-1

Semifinals
Greeneville defeated Boston 2-1 (OT)
Utah defeated Stanislaus United 3-0

Championship
Utah defeated Greenville 1-0

References

3
2001
Association football events curtailed due to the September 11 attacks